Patricia Vonne (born December 19, 1969) is an American singer and actress.

Biography
A native of San Antonio, Texas, Vonne is the sister of filmmaker Robert Rodriguez and moved to New York City in 1990–2001 to pursue her artistic ambitions. She worked in Europe and the U.S., featured in the 2005 film Sin City as Dallas (aka Zorro Girl), Spykids, Desperado, Machete Kills, Four Rooms, and appeared in national/international commercials and other film work. She formed a band, which performed on the New York circuit from 1998 to 2001. She then relocated to her native Texas, from where she tours in the U.S., Mexico and Europe including the World Expo in Japan, Montreux Jazz Festival in Switzerland, Kennedy Center in Washington D.C., Grand Ole Opry and United Nations in NYC for Artists United to help stop human trafficking.

In 2020, she released The Texicana Mamas, a debut album in collaboration with Tish Hinojosa and Stephanie Urbina Jones.

In 2021, the three time Austin Music Award winner released her eighth studio album "My Favorite Holiday" on her own Bandolera Records featuring an all star cast including Rubén Blades, David Grissom, Rosie Flores, Stephen Ferrone (Tom Petty), Carmine Rojas (David Bowie), Thommy Price (Billy Idol), Scott Plunkett on piano, Rowland Salley on bass (Chris Isaak) and Johnny Reno on saxophone.

She toured as a member of Tito & Tarantula, the band featured in the film From Dusk Till Dawn in 2002. Her song "Traeme Paz" was featured in the film Once Upon a Time in Mexico.

Discography

Self
Patricia Vonne (2003)
Guitars And Castanets (2005)
Firebird (2007)
Worth It (2010)
Rattle My Cage (2013)
Viva Bandolera (2015)
Top of the Mountain (2018)

The Texicana Mamas (Patricia Vonne, Tish Hinojosa, Stephanie Urbina Jones)
The Texicana Mamas (2020, self-released, internet only)

Filmography

Actress
Desperado (1995) as Bar Girl 
Four Rooms (1995) (as Patricia Vonne Rodriguez) as Corpse (segment "The Misbehavers") 
Spy Kids (2001) as Spy Bridesmaid 
El Segundo (2004) as Maribel 
Sin City (2005) as Dallas 
Heavenly Beauties (2005) as Spanish Dancer
Sin City: A Dame to Kill For (2014) as Dallas

Miscellaneous crew
Spy Kids 2: The Island of Lost Dreams (2002) (ballet choreographer)

Self
 Patricia Vonne: Concierto Teatro de la Ciudad (2005) (TV) as Herself

References

External links

 Official website

1969 births
American actresses of Mexican descent
American women singers
American film actresses
American musicians of Mexican descent
Living people
Musicians from San Antonio
People from San Antonio
Actresses from San Antonio
21st-century American women